The 2014 Apia International Sydney was a joint 2014 ATP World Tour and 2014 WTA Tour tennis tournament, played on outdoor hard courts in Sydney, New South Wales. It was the 122nd edition of the tournament and took place at the NSW Tennis Centre in Sydney, Australia. It was held from 5 to 11 January 2014. It was part of the Australian Open Series in preparation for the first Grand Slam of the year.

Women's singles defending champion, Agnieszka Radwańska and ATP players, Juan Martín del Potro, Jerzy Janowicz and Bernard Tomic announced their participation in the event.

Point distribution

Prize money

1 Qualifiers prize money is also the Round of 32 prize money
* per team

Broadcast 
In Australia, all matches were broadcast live on 7Two. The men's final was also due to air on 7Two, however it was moved to Channel Seven (7Two's parent channel) when Australian Bernard Tomic made the final match. A movie which was due to air on Channel Seven was swapped to 7Two. Day coverage was hosted by Ryan Phelan while night coverage was hosted by Matt White.

ATP singles main-draw entrants

Seeds 

1 Rankings as of 30 December 2013.

Other entrants 
The following players received wildcards into the singles main draw:
  Marinko Matosevic
  Matthew Ebden
  Samuel Groth

The following players received entry from the qualifying draw:
  Jan-Lennard Struff
  Blaž Kavčič
  Ryan Harrison
  Sergiy Stakhovsky

The following players received entry into a lucky loser spot:
  Albert Ramos

Withdrawals
Before the tournament
  Nicolás Almagro → replaced by  Bernard Tomic
  Fabio Fognini (left leg strain) → replaced by  Nicolas Mahut
  Vasek Pospisil (lower back injury) → replaced by  Albert Ramos

Retirements
  Édouard Roger-Vasselin (fatigue)

ATP doubles main-draw entrants

Seeds 

1 Rankings as of 30 December 2013.

Other entrants 
The following pairs received wildcards into the doubles main draw:
  James Duckworth /  Samuel Groth
The following pair received entry as alternates:
  Mikhail Elgin /  Denis Istomin

Withdrawals
Before the tournament
  Matthew Ebden (left ankle injury)

WTA singles main-draw entrants

Seeds 

1 Rankings as of 30 December 2013.

Other entrants 
The following players received wildcards into the singles main draw:
  Jarmila Gajdošová
  Ajla Tomljanović
The following players received entry from the qualifying draw:
  Lauren Davis
  Victoria Duval
  Bethanie Mattek-Sands
  Christina McHale
  Paula Ormaechea
  Tsvetana Pironkova
The following players received entry as lucky losers:
  Julia Görges
  Varvara Lepchenko

Withdrawals
Before the tournament
  Jamie Hampton (hip injury) → replaced by  Julia Görges
  Sloane Stephens (wrist injury) → replaced by  Varvara Lepchenko

Retirements
  Bethanie Mattek-Sands (lumbar spine injury)

WTA doubles main-draw entrants

Seeds 

1 Rankings as of 30 December 2013.

Other entrants 
The following pairs received wildcards into the doubles main draw:
  Simona Halep /  Raluca Olaru
  Jarmila Gajdošová /  Ajla Tomljanović

Finals

Men's singles 

  Juan Martín del Potro defeated  Bernard Tomic 6–3, 6–1

Women's singles 

  Tsvetana Pironkova defeated  Angelique Kerber, 6–4, 6–4

Men's doubles 

  Daniel Nestor /  Nenad Zimonjić defeated  Rohan Bopanna /  Aisam-ul-Haq Qureshi 7–6(7–3), 7–6(7–3)

Women's doubles 

  Tímea Babos /  Lucie Šafářová defeated  Sara Errani /  Roberta Vinci, 7–5, 3–6, [10–7]

References

External links 
 

 
2010s in Sydney